Bursuc is a village in Nisporeni District, Moldova.

See also
Hâncu Monastery

References

Villages of Nisporeni District